The men's 5000 metres at the 2006 European Athletics Championships were held at the Ullevi on August 10 and August 13.

Farah took the lead with 1000 m to go and stretched the field. A sprint to line resulted in España over taking Farah metres from the line. A quick finish by Higuero moved him into third over Turkey's Halil Akkaş.

Medalists

Schedule

Results

Semifinals
First 5 in each heat (Q) and the next 5 fastest (q) advance to the Final.

Final

External links
Results

5000
5000 metres at the European Athletics Championships